Kessleria mixta is a moth of the family Yponomeutidae. It is found in Albania.

The length of the forewings is approximately 7 mm. The forewings are whitish brown. The hindwings are grey. Adults have been recorded in mid July.

References

Moths described in 1992
Yponomeutidae
Endemic fauna of Albania
Moths of Europe